Praxitelis Vouros (born 5 May 1995) is a Greek professional footballer who plays as a centre-back for Super League club OFI.

Club career
On 29 August 2017, Cypriot champions APOEL signed Greek defender on a 3-year contract for an undisclosed fee. With the acquisition of Praxiteles Vouros, APOEL keeps the Greek element in his roster and bets on the skills of the 22-year-old footballer. APOEL coach Giorgos Donis immediately asked the acquisition of the young defender as he solved his contract with Greek champions Olympiacos. The 22-year old defender had been a member of Greek champions Olympiacos for the past four seasons, having only four substitute appearances in those years for the Greek championship. On 25 July 2018 he renewed his contract to the summer of 2022 with APOEL.

On 1 August 2020, Vouros joined OFI on a three-year contract. On 20 September 2021, he scored his first professional goal, in the delays of a 3-3 home draw, after a three-goal lead from rivals AEK in an astonishing comeback from his club OFI Crete F.C.

International career
Vouros was 27 times capped with the U21, U19, U18 and U17 Greek national teams.

Career statistics

Honours
Olympiacos
Super League Greece: 2013–14, 2014–15, 2015–16
Greek Cup: 2014–15

APOEL
Cypriot First Division: 2017–18

Notes

References

1995 births
Living people
Greek footballers
Greece youth international footballers
Greece under-21 international footballers
Super League Greece players
Cypriot First Division players
Olympiacos F.C. players
Levadiakos F.C. players
APOEL FC players
OFI Crete F.C. players
Greek expatriate footballers
Expatriate footballers in Cyprus
Greek expatriate sportspeople in Cyprus
Greek expatriates in Cyprus
Association football defenders
People from Mytilene
Sportspeople from the North Aegean